Jacob Augustus "Jack" Ridgway (July 23, 1888 – February 23, 1928) was a Major League Baseball pitcher who played for the Baltimore Terrapins of the Federal League in .

References

External links

1888 births
1928 deaths
Baltimore Terrapins players
Major League Baseball pitchers
Baseball players from Pennsylvania
Greensboro Champs players
Greenville Spinners players
Columbia Comers players
Charleston Sea Gulls players
Topeka Jayhawks players
Deaths from carbon monoxide poisoning
Accidental deaths in Pennsylvania